UCST may refer to:

 United Church Schools Trust, a UK educational charity
 Upper critical solution temperature, in chemistry